The white-rumped spinetail or white-rumped needletail (Zoonavena sylvatica) is a species of swift found in the forests of Bangladesh, India (the Western Ghats) and Nepal. It is often seen over waterbodies in the middle of forest. It can resemble a house swift but has a white vent.

References

white-rumped spinetail
Birds of India
Birds of Nepal
white-rumped spinetail